Oula Township (Mandarin: 欧拉镇) is a township in Maqu County, Gannan Tibetan Autonomous Prefecture, Gansu, China. In 2010, Oula Township had a total population of 5,142: 2,772 males and 2,370 females: 1,434 aged under 14, 3,428 aged between 15 and 65 and 280 aged over 65.

References 

Township-level divisions of Gansu
Gannan Tibetan Autonomous Prefecture